List of Guggenheim fellowship winners for 1974.

United States and Canada fellows 

 Hazard Adams, Byron W. and Alice L. Lockwoood Emeritus Professor of Humanities; Professor of English, University of Washington.
 Flavia Alaya, Professor of Literature and Cultural History, Ramapo College of New Jersey.
 Edward Alexander, Professor of English, University of Washington.
 Frederick J. Almgren Jr., deceased. Mathematics.
 J. L. Alperin, Professor of Mathematics, University of Chicago.
 Donald Appleyard, deceased. Urban Planning.
 Michael Asher, artist, Los Angeles.
 Jerold Stephen Auerbach, Professor of History, Wellesley College.
 John Norman Austin, Professor of Classics, University of Massachusetts Amherst.
 Andrew S. Bajer, Professor of Biology, University of Oregon.
 Paul Thornell Baker, Professor Emeritus of Anthropology, Pennsylvania State University.
 Korkut Bardakci, Professor of Physics, University of California, Berkeley.
 John Walton Barker, Jr, Emeritus Professor of History, University of Wisconsin–Madison.
 William Barrett, deceased. Philosophy.
 Robert Beauchamp, deceased. Fine Arts, Painting.
 Saul Benison, Professor of History;, Professor Emeritus of Environmental Health, College of Medicine, University of Cincinnati.
 John Calvin Berg, Rehnberg Professor of Chemical Engineering, University of Washington.
 Stephen Berg, poet; Professor of English, Philadelphia College of Art.
 Robert Allan Bernheim, Professor of Chemistry, Pennsylvania State University.
 Jacob Bigeleisen, Distinguished Professor Emeritus of Chemistry, Stony Brook University.
 George R. Bird, Professor of Chemistry, Rutgers University.
 Joseph Warren Bishop, Jr, deceased. Law.
 Nell Blaine, deceased. Fine Arts, Painting.
 Laura Bohannan, Professor of Anthropology, University of Illinois at Chicago Circle.
 Albert Boime, Professor of Art History, University of California, Los Angeles: 1974, 1984.
 Mark Boulby, Professor Emeritus of German, University of British Columbia.
 Barbara Cherry Bowen, Chair, Professor of French and Comparative Literature, Vanderbilt University, Nashville, TN.
 James B. Boyd, deceased. Biochemistry-Molecular Biology.
 Roberto G. Brambilla, Architect and Urban Designer, New York City.
 Roger Ware Brockett, An Wang Professor of Electrical Engineering and Computer Science, Harvard University.
 Frederick Phillips Brooks, Jr., Kenan Professor of Computer Science, University of North Carolina at Chapel Hill.
 Philip R. Brooks, Professor of Chemistry, Rice University.
 William Browder, Professor of Mathematics, Princeton University.
 George Bruening, Professor of Plant Pathology; Biochemist in Experiment Station, University of California, Davis.
 Jean Louis Bruneau, Professor of French and Comparative Literature, Harvard University.
 Gerald L. Bruns, William and Hazel White Professor, University of Notre Dame: 1974, 1985.
 Bob B. Buchanan, Professor of Molecular Plant Biology, University of California, Berkeley.
 Howard Buchwald, artist, New York City.
 Edwin Burmeister, Research Professor of Economics, Duke University.
 Walter Dean Burnham, Professor of Political Science, University of Texas at Austin.
 Richard L. Bushman, Morris Professor of History, Columbia University.
 Joseph A. Callaway, deceased. Senior Professor Emeritus of Old Testament, Southern Baptist Theological Seminary.
 Martin C. Carey, Professor of Medicine and Professor of Health Sciences and Technology, Harvard Medical School.
 Stephen McKinley Carr, architect, Arrowstreet, Inc., Cambridge, Massachusetts.
 Ronald A. Castellino, Chair, Department of Medical Imaging, Memorial Sloane-Kettering Cancer Center, New York City.
 Matthew Y. Chen, Professor of Linguistics, University of California, San Diego.
 Fredi Chiappelli, deceased. Italian Literature.
 Allen T. Y. Chwang, Sir Robert Ho Tung Professor and Department Head of Mechanical Engineering, University of Hong Kong .
 William A. Clemens, Professor of Paleontology, University of California, Berkeley.
 William Brooks Clift, III, photographer, Santa Fe, New Mexico: 1974, 1980.
 Clarence Lee Cline, Ashbel H. Smith Professor Emeritus of English, University of Texas at Austin.
 George Cohen, Professor Emeritus of Art, Northwestern University
 Frank Van Deren Coke, Continuing Visiting Professor, School of Art, Arizona State University, Tempe, Arizona.
 Allan Meakin Collins, Research Professor of Education, Boston College and Professor of Education & Social Policy, Northwestern University.
 Alfred Fletcher Conard, Henry M Butzel Professor Emeritus of Law, University of Michigan.
 Carl Allin Cornell, Professor of Civil Engineering.
 James Welton Cornman, deceased. Philosophy.
 Thomas Joseph Cottle, Professor of Education, Boston University.
 Diana Crane, Professor of Sociology, University of Pennsylvania.
 Ernest R. Davidson, Distinguished Professor of Chemistry, Indiana University.
 Bertram H. Davis, Professor of English, Florida State University.
 Gene Davis, deceased. Fine Arts.
 Kenneth Sydney Davis, deceased. Biography.
 John M. Deutch, Institute Professor of Chemistry, Massachusetts Institute of Technology.
 Michael Di Biase, photographer.
 Penelope Billings Reed Doob, Professor of English and Multidisciplinary Studies, York University, Ontario, Canada.
 Jack Daniel Douglas, Professor of Sociology, University of California, San Diego.
 James Dow, photographer; Instructor in Photography, School of the Museum of Fine Arts, Boston.
 Brian Dutton, deceased. Spanish and Portuguese Literature.
 Clifford John Earle, Jr., Professor of Mathematics, Cornell University.
 Harry Eckstein, deceased. UCI Distinguished Professor and Professor of Political Science, University of California, Irvine.
 Scott McNeil Eddie, Professor of Economics, University of Toronto.
 Robert S. Edgar, Professor Emeritus of Biology, University of California, Santa Cruz.
 Russell Edson, writer, Darien, Connecticut.
 William J. Eggleston, photographer, Memphis.
 Eldon J. Epp, Harkness Professor Emeritus of Biblical Literature and Dean Emeritus of Humanities and Social Sciences, Case Western Reserve University.
 Solomon David Erulkar, deceased. Neuroscience.
 Susan M. Ervin-Tripp, Professor of Rhetoric, University of California, Berkeley.
 Stephanie Evanitsky, choreographer, New York City.
 Thomas E. Everhart, President Emeritus, California Institute of Technology.
 Gerald David Fasman, Louis I. and Bessie Rosenfield Professor of Biochemistry, Brandeis University: 1974, 1988.
 Joel Feinberg, Regents Professor of Philosophy and Law, University of Arizona.
 Gerald R. Fink, American Cancer Society Professor of Genetics, Whitehead Institute for Biomedical Research, Massachusetts Institute of Technology.
 Frank W. Fitch, Albert D. Lasker Professor Emeritus in the Medical Sciences; Director, The Ben May Institute, University of Chicago.
 George William Flynn, Eugene Higgins Professor of Chemistry, Columbia University.
 Paul Foster, playwright; President, La Mama Theatre, New York City.
 Primous Fountain, composer, Chicago: 1974, 1977.
 Phyllis Joan Freeman, senior editor, translator, and scholar, Great Neck, New York.
 Donald M. Friedman, Professor of English, University of California, Berkeley.
 Frank Gagliano, playwright; Benedum Professor of Playwriting, University of West Virginia.
 Richard Newton Gardner, Professor of Law and International Organization, Columbia University.
 George Palmer Garrett, writer; Henry Hoyns Professor of English, University of Virginia at Charlottesville.
 Theodore Henry Geballe, Theodore and Sydney Rosenberg Professor Emeritus of Applied Physics, Stanford University.
 Irma Gigli, The Walter and Mary Mischer Professor in Molecular Medicine, University of Texas Health Science Center, Houston.
 Charles Ginnever, artist, New York City.
 Seymour Ginsburg, Fletcher Jones Professor of Computer Science, University of Southern California.
 Ira Gitler, Jazz Faculty, Manhattan School of Music
 Dohn George Glitz, Emeritus Professor of Biological Chemistry, University of California, Los Angeles.
 Bernard R. Goldstein, Associate Professor, Jewish Studies Program and Department of History and Philosophy of Science, University of Pittsburgh.
 Melvin J. Goldstein, Senior Investigator, Bromine Compounds, Ltd., Beer Sheva, Israel.
 Robert E. Goldstein, Director, Division of Cardiology; Professor of Medicine and Physiology, Uniformed Services University of the Health Sciences, Bethesda, Maryland.
 Emmet Gowin, photographer; Professor of Photography, Princeton University.
 Martin Burgess Green, Emeritus Professor of English, Tufts University: 1974, 1977.
 Stephen J. Greenblatt, Harry Levin Professor of Literature, Harvard University: 1974, 1982.
 Leonard Gross, Professor of Mathematics, Cornell University.
 Howard E. Gruber, Professor of Psychology, Teachers College, Columbia University.
 Werner L. Gundersheimer, director, Folger Shakespeare Library, Washington, D.C..
 Jean Howard Hagstrum, deceased. 18th Century English Literature.
 David Nicholas Hancock, deceased. Film.
 Joel F. Handler, Professor of Law, University of California, Los Angeles.
 Louis Rudolph Harlan, Distinguished Professor of History, University of Maryland, College Park.
 Robert Haselkorn, Fanny L. Pritzker Distinguished Service Professor of Biophysics and Theoretical Biology, University of Chicago.
 Shirley Hazzard, writer, New York City.
 Eliot S. Hearst, Adjunct Professor of Psychology, University of Arizona.
 Barbara Hinckley, deceased. Political Science.
 Peter Crafts Hodgson, Charles G. Finney Professor of Theology, Vanderbilt University.
 Jill Hoffman, poet, New York City.
 William M. Hoffman, playwright, New York City.
 Harry P. C. Hogenkamp, Professor of Biochemistry, University of Minnesota.
 Paul Hollander, Professor of Sociology, University of Massachusetts Amherst.
 Ralph Leslie Holloway, Jr., Professor of Anthropology, Columbia University.
 Raymond Frederick Hopkins, Richter Professor of Political Science, Swarthmore College.
 William DeWitt Horrocks, Jr., Professor of Chemistry, Pennsylvania State University.
 Richard G. Hovannisian, Professor of History, University of California, Los Angeles.
 Sandria Hu, Artist; Professor of Art, University of Houston at Clear Lake City.
 Francis Gilman Hutchins, director, Amarta Press, West Franklin, New Hampshire.
 John Woodside Hutchinson, Gordon McKay Professor of Applied Mechanics, Harvard University.
 Akira Iriye, Professor of American Diplomatic History, University of Chicago.
 James Francis Ivory, filmmaker, New York City.
 John M. Jacobus, Professor of Art, Dartmouth College.
 Charles Wilson Brega James, deceased. Fine Arts Research.
 Martin E. Jay, Professor of History, University of California, Berkeley.
 Robert Eugene Jensen, Professor of Accounting, Trinity University.
 Robert Earl Johannes, marine ecologist, Tasmania, Australia.
 Gerald Jonas, Writer, New York City.
 Sanford H. Kadish, Morrison Professor Emeritus of Law, University of California, Berkeley.
 Sidney Henry Kahana, Senior Scientist, Brookhaven National Laboratory.
 Michael Kassler, Managing Director, Michael Kassler and Associates, McMahons Point, Australia.
 Israel Joseph Katz, Research Associate, Teaneck, NJ.
 Jane A. Kaufman, artist, New York City.
 Donald R. Kelley, James Westfall Thompson Professor of History, Rutgers University: 1974, 1981.
 George Armstrong Kelly, deceased. Political Science.
 Norman Kelvin, Professor of English, City College, City University of New York: 1974.
 Tracy S. Kendler, deceased. Emeritus Professor of Psychology, University of California, Santa Barbara.
 Frank J. Kerr, Professor Emeritus of Astronomy, University of Maryland.
 André Kertész, deceased. Photography.
 Robion Cromwell Kirby, Professor of Mathematics, University of California, Berkeley.
 Lewis J. Kleinsmith, Arthur F. Thurnau Professor of Biology, University of Michigan.
 Bettina L. Knapp, Professor of Romance Languages and Comparative Literature, Hunter College and Graduate Center, City University of New York.
 Etheridge Knight, deceased. Poetry.
 Alan J. Kohn, Professor of Zoology, University of Washington.
 Philip A. Kuhn, Francis Lee Higginson Professor of History and of East Asian Languages and Civilizations, Harvard University.
 Meyer Kupferman, composer; Emeritus Professor of Composition and Chamber Music, Sarah Lawrence College.
 Phyllis Lamhut, choreographer; Artistic Director, Phyllis Lamhut Dance Company, Inc.; Instructor, Tisch School of the Arts, New York University.
 Elinor Langer, writer; Portland, Oregon.
 James S. Langer, Professor of Physics, University of California, Santa Barbara.
 Christopher Lasch, deceased. U.S. History.
 Bibb Latané, Professor of Psychology, University of North Carolina at Chapel Hill.
 James Ronald Lawler, Edward Carson Waller Professor of French, University of Chicago.
 John Scott Leigh, Jr., Professor of Biochemistry/Biophysics, Director, Metabolic Magnetic Resonance Research Center, University of Pennsylvania.
 J. A. Leo Lemay, H. F. du pont Winterthur Professor of English, University of Delaware.
 James T. Lemon, Emeritus Professor of Geography, University of Toronto.
 Fred Lerdahl, composer; Fritz Reiner Professor of Music Composition, Columbia University.
 Barry Edward Le Va, artist, New York City.
 David Ford Lindsley, Associate Professor of Physiology, University of Southern California School of Medicine.
 Stuart Michael Linn, Head, Professor of Biochemistry, University of California, Berkeley.
 Edgar Lipworth, deceased. Particle Physics.
 Robert Shing-Hei Liu, Professor of Chemistry, University of Hawaii at Manoa.
 Leon Livingstone, Professor Emeritus of Spanish, State University of New York at Buffalo.
 Claudia A. Lopez, writer; editor emeritus, The Papers of Benjamin Franklin, Yale University.
 Susan Lowey, Professor of Biochemistry, Brandeis University.
 Joaquin Mazdak Luttinger, deceased. Physics.
 James Karl Lyon, Scheuber-Veinz Professor of German, Brigham Young University.
 Frank MacShane, writer; Professor of Writing School of the Arts, Columbia University.
 Leon Madansky, Decker Professor of Physics, Johns Hopkins University.
 William Majors, deceased. Fine Arts-Graphics.
 Edward E. Malefakis, Professor of History, Columbia University.
 John Frederick Manley, Associate Professor of Political Science, Stanford University.
 Nicholas Marsicano, deceased. Fine Arts-Drawing.
 Donald B. Martin, Emeritus Professor of Medicine, University of Pennsylvania.
 Jack Matthews, writer; Distinguished Professor of English, Ohio University.
 John Patrick McCall, Consultant, Xavier University, New Orleans, Louisiana; President Emeritus and Professor Emeritus of English, Knox College.
 Frank D. McConnell, deceased. 19th Century English Literature.
 Tom McHale, deceased. Fiction.
 John Paul McTague, associate director, Office of Science and Technology Policy, Washington DC.
 Mark Medoff, playwright; Professor Emeritus of Theatre Arts & English, New Mexico State University.
 Joan P. Mencher, Professor of Anthropology, The Graduate Center, City University of New York.
 Roger Mertin, photographer; Professor of Fine Arts, University of Rochester.
 Christopher Middleton, writer; David J. Bruton Centennial Professor Emeritus of Germanic Languages, University of Texas at Austin.
 Barbara Stoler Miller, deceased. East Asian Studies.
 Clement A. Miller, Professor Emeritus of Fine Arts, John Carroll University.
 Harold A. Mooney, Paul S. Achilles Professor of Environmental Biology, Stanford University.
 George H. Morrison, Professor of Chemistry, Cornell University.
 Raymond Dale Mountain, NIST Fellow.
 Michael Murrin, Professor of English and of the Humanities, and Professor of Religion and Literature, University of Chicago.
 Thea Musgrave, composer, New York City; Distinguished Professor of Music, Queens College, CUNY, Flushing NY: 1974, 1982.
 Pandit Pran Nath, deceased. Music Composition.
 Victor Saul Navasky, writer; publisher, editorial director, The Nation, New York City.
 Alan H. Nelson, Professor of English, University of California, Berkeley.
 Gerry Neugebauer, Professor of Physics, California Institute of Technology.
 Charles Newman, writer; Professor of English, Washington University.
 Brian E. Newton, Professor Emeritus of Linguistics, Simon Fraser University
 Ernest Pascal Noble, Pike Professor of Alcohol Studies, University of California, Los Angeles.
 Richard Nonas, artist, New York City.
 Barbara Novak, Professor of Art History, Barnard College, Columbia University.
 Wallace Eugene Oates, Professor of Economics, University of Maryland, College Park.
 Ken T. Ohara, photographer, Glendale, California.
 Tetsu Okuhara, pPhotographer, New York City.
 Bernard Jay Paris, Emeritus Professor of English, University of Florida.
 Hershel Parker, H. Fletcher Brown Professor of American Romanticism, University of Delaware.
 Robert Ladislav Parker, Associate Professor of Geophysics, University of California, San Diego.
 Philip Pechukas, Professor of Chemistry, Columbia University.
 Joel Perlman, artist; Instructor in Fine Arts, School of Visual Arts, New York City.
 Robert P. Perry, senior member, Institute for Cancer Research; Professor of Biophysics, University of Pennsylvania.
 Barbara G. Pickard, Professor of Biology, Washington University.
 Robert Pirsig, writer, Portsmouth, New Hampshire.
 Richard Poirier, Marius Bewley Professor of English, Rutgers University.
 Edward C. Prescott, Professor of Economics, University of Minnesota.
 Douglas Radcliff-Umstead, deceased. Italian Literature.
 J. Austin Ranney, Professor of Political Science, University of California at Berkeley.
 Klaus Raschke, Professor, Plant Physiology Institute, University of Göttingen.
 Edward Reich, Distinguished Professor of Pharmacology, SUNY at Stony Brook.
 Erica Reiner, John A. Wilson Distinguished Service Professor Emeritus of Assyriology, University of Chicago.
 Richard Rhodes, writer, Cambridge, Massachusetts.
 Frank M. Richter, Chair, Professor of Geophysics, University of Chicago.
 Robert E. Ricklefs, Curators' Professor of Biology, University of Missouri-St. Louis.
 Brunilde S. Ridgway, Rhys Carpenter Professor Emeritus of Classical and Near Eastern Archaeology, Bryn Mawr College.
 Richard Robbins, Professor Emeritus of Sociology, University of Massachusetts Boston.
 Fred Colson Robinson, Douglas Tracy Smith Professor of English, Yale University.
 James William Robinson, Emeritus Professor of Chemistry, Louisiana State University (Baton Rouge).
 Paul Sheldon Ronder, deceased. Film.
 David Rosand, Meyer Schapiro Professor of Art History, Columbia University.
 Fred S. Rosen, President, Center for Blood Research and James L. Gamble Professor of Pediatrics, Harvard Medical School.
 Milton J. Rosenberg, Professor of Psychology, University of Chicago.
 Lillian Ross, writer; staff Writer, The New Yorker Magazine.
 John Roger Roth, Distinguished Professor of Biology, University of Utah.
 Albert Rothenberg, Clinical Professor of Psychiatry, Yale University.
 Jerome Rothenberg, poet; Emeritus Professor of English, University of California-San Diego.
 Lawrence Ryan, Professor of German, University of Massachusetts Amherst.
 Ryuzo Sato, C.V. Starr Professor of Economics, New York University.
 R. Murray Schafer, composer, Occidental, California.
 Paul Namon Schatz, Emeritus Professor of Chemistry, University of Virginia.
 Leo F. Schnore, deceased. Sociology.
 David Schoenbaum, Professor of History, The University of Iowa.
 John Luther Schofill, Jr., filmmaker, Seaside, California.
 Martin E. Seligman, Bob and Arlene Kogod Term Chair, University of Pennsylvania.
 Edwin Bennett Shostak, artist, New York City.
 Marcia B. Siegel, Emeritus Professor of Performance Studies, New York University.
 David Oliver Siegmund, Professor of Statistics, Stanford University.
 Paul B. Sigler, Professor and Investigator, Howard Hughes Medical Institute, Yale University.
 Thomas Elliott Skidmore, Carlos Manuel de Céspedes Professor of Modern Latin American History, Brown University.
 Lawrence Sklar, William K. Frankena Collegiate Professor and Professor of Philosophy, University of Michigan.
 Douglas Milton Sloan, Associate Professor of History and Education, Teachers College, Columbia University.
 Patricia H. Sloane, Professor of Art, New York City Community College, City University of New York.
 Steven Sloman, artist; Instructor in Painting and Associate Dean, New York Studio School.
 Henry Nash Smith, deceased. American Literature.
 Walter L. Smith, Statistics.
 Roman Smoluchowski, deceased. Physics.
 Robert Somerville, Professor of Religion and History, Columbia University: 1974, 1987.
 Frederick Sommer, deceased. Photography.
 James Keith Sonnier, artist, New York City. Pseudonym: Sonnier, Keith.
 Edward A. Spiegel, Professor of Astronomy, Columbia University.
 Hans-Peter Stahl, Andrew W. Mellon Professor of Classics, University of Pittsburgh.
 Robert Culp Stalnaker, Professor of Philosophy, M.I.T., Cambridge, MA.
 Howard Stein, Professor of Philosophy, University of Chicago.
 Ralph Steiner, deceased. Film.
 Alfred C. Stepan, Burgess Professor of Political Science, Columbia University.
 Shlomo Sternberg, Professor of Mathematics, Harvard University.
 David F. Stock, Composer; Professor of Music, Duquesne University, Pittsburgh.
 Alfred Stracher, Chairman, Distinguished Professor of Biochemistry, State University of New York Downstate Medical Center at Brooklyn.
 Mark Strand, poet; Andrew MacLeish Distinguished Service Professor, University of Chicago.
 William B. Streett, Joseph Silbert Dean of Engineering, Emeritus, Cornell University.
 Jack L. Strominger, Higgins Professor of Biochemistry, Harvard University.
 Robert Dale Sweeney, Classics, Fayetteville, Tennessee.
 Julian Szekely, deceased. Engineering.
 William Tarr, sculptor, Sarasota, Florida.
 Alexander Theroux, writer, West Barnstable, Massachusetts.
 Charles Tilly, Professor of Sociology, Columbia University.
 Humphrey Tonkin, President Emeritus; University Professor of the Humanities, University of Hartford.
 Preston A. Trombly, composer, New York City.
 Alwyn Scott Turner, photographer, Manzanita, Oregon.
 Robert Y. Turner, Professor of English, University of Pennsylvania.
 James A. Turrell, artist, Flagstaff, Arizona.
 Paolo Valesio, Director of Graduate Studies; Professor of Italian Linguistics, Yale University.
 John Britton Vickery, Vice Chancellor, University of California, Riverside.
 David Von Schlegell, Deceased. Fine Arts, Sculpture.
 Alexander Vucinich, Professor Emeritus of History and Sociology of Science, University of Pennsylvania: 1974, 1985.
 R. Stephen Warner, Professor of Sociology, University of Illinois at Chicago.
 Watt Wetmore Webb, S. B. Eckert Professor in Engineering and Professor of Applied Physics, Cornell University.
 Michael A. Weinstein, Professor of Political Science, Purdue University.
 William Ira Weisberger, Professor of Physics, State University of New York at Stony Brook.
 Ulrich W. Weisstein, Professor Emeritus of Comparative Literature and of Germanic Studies, Indiana University.
 Raymond O'Neil Wells, Jr., Professor of Mathematics, Rice University.
 Frank Simon Werblin, Associate Professor of Electrical Engineering and Computer Sciences, University of California, Berkeley.
 Winthrop Wetherbee, Avalon Foundation Professor in the Humanities, Cornell University.
 Donald F. Wheelock, composer; Associate Professor of Music, Smith College: 1974, 1984.
 Reed Whittemore, Professor of English, University of Maryland, College Park. Appointed as Whittemore, Edward Reed.
 C. K. Williams, poet, Greensboro, North Carolina.
 Gernot Ludwig Windfuhr, Professor of Iranian Studies, University of Michigan.
 Marian Hannah Winter, Deceased. Theatre Arts.
 Eugene Victor Wolfenstein, Professor of Political Science, University of California, Los Angeles.
 Don Worth, photographer; Professor of Art, San Francisco State University.
 Jay Wright, poet, Bradford, Vermont.
 Sanford Wurmfeld, artist; Chair, Professor of Art, Hunter College, City University of New York.
 Bertram Wyatt-Brown, Richard J. Milbauer Professor of History, University of Florida.
 Gabrielle Yablonsky, Research Associate, Center for South and Southeast Asian Studies, University of California, Berkeley.
 Susan Yankowitz, playwright, New York City.
 Robert Yaris, Professor of Chemistry, Washington University.
 Al Young, writer, Palo Alto, California.
 John A. Yount, writer; Emeritus Professor of English, University of New Hampshire.
 Harris P. Zeigler, Distinguished University Professor of Psychology, Hunter College, City University of New York.
 Paul F. Zweifel, University Distinguished Professor Emeritus, Virginia Polytechnic Institute and State University.

Latin American and Caribbean Fellows 

 René Acuña-Sandoval, research ethnohistorian, Institute of Philological Research, National Autonomous University of Mexico: 1974, 1983.
 Lea Baider, Associate Professor, Medical Psychology, Director, Psycho-Oncology Unit, Sharett Institute of Oncology, Jerusalem.
 José Francisco S. Bianco, deceased. Fiction.
 Alfredo Bryce Echenique, writer, Spain.
 Augusto Ricardo Cardich, Professor Emeritus of American Archaeology, National University of La Plata.
 Marcelino Cereijido, Professor of Physiology, Center for Research and Advanced Studies, National Polytechnic Institute, Mexico City.
 Miguel Condé, artist (painting, drawing and etching), Madrid and Barcelona, Spain.
 Héctor Luis D'Antoni, Senior Research Scientist, NASA Ames Research Center, Moffett Field, California.
 Humberto Díaz Casanueva, deceased. General Nonfiction.
 Manuel Felguérez, artist; Instructor in the Visual Arts, National School of Plastic Arts, National Autonomous University of Mexico.
 Juan H. Fernández, Professor of Biology, University of Chile.
 Erasmo Madureira Ferreira, Professor of Physics, Federal University of Rio de Janeiro.
 Risieri Frondizi (1910-1983), Philosophy.
 Juan José Gurrola Iturriaga, playwright; advisor for cultural affairs, National Autonomous University of Mexico.
 Celia Jakubowicz de Matzkin, Research Associate, Laboratory of Experimental Psychology, University of Paris V.
 Pablo Macera, Professor of Social Sciences, National University of San Marcos.
 Clodomiro Marticorena, Professor of Botany, University of Concepción.
 Luiz C. M. Miranda, Technical Director, Institute of Advanced Studies, Aerospace Technological Institute Sao José dos Campos, Brazil.
 Norma Bahia Pontes, filmmaker, Río de Janeiro. aka Bahia, Norma.
 Alberto Carlos Riccardi, Professor of Paleotology, National University of La Plata; Head Division of Invertebrate Paleozoology, Museum of La Plata.
 Neantro Saavedra Rivano, Professor of Mathematics, Simón Bolívar University.
 Juan Alberto Schnack, Career Investigator, National Council of Argentina; Instructor, Institute of Limnology, University of La Plata.
 Javier Sologuren Moreno, writer, Lima, Peru.
 Mario Suwalsky Weinzimmer, Professor of Chemistry, University of Concepción.
 Mario Toral, artist, New York City.
 Roberto Torretti, Professor of Philosophy, University of Puerto Rico, Río Piedras: 1974, 1980.
 Claudio Véliz, Director, University Professors Program, Boston University.
 Mario Vergara Martínez, Professor of Geology, University of Chile

See also 
Guggenheim Fellowship

External links 
Guggenheim Fellows for 1974

1974
1974 awards